Wang Zhenyi (1768–1797) was a scientist from the Qing dynasty. She breached the feudal customs of the time, which hindered women's rights, by working to educate herself in subjects such as astronomy, mathematics, geography, and medicine. She was well known for her contributions in astronomy, mathematics, and poetry. She was an acclaimed scholar: "An extraordinary woman of 18th century China."

Biography

Early Iife and family
Wang's ancestral home is in Anhui province, but her grandfather's family moved to Jiangning or present-day Nanjing. She was very fond of reading when she was a child and was very clever.

Her family consisted of her grandfather, grandmother, and her father. Her grandfather Wang Zhefu, was a former governor of Fengchen county and Xuanhua District. He had a broad and profound intellect with a deep love for reading and had a collection of over seventy-five bookshelves. Her father Wang Xichen failed the imperial examination and instead studied medical science and recorded his findings in a four-volume collection called "Yifang Yanchao" (Collection of Medical Prescriptions). Her grandmother's maiden name was Dong. Her grandfather was her first teacher in astronomy; her grandmother was her teacher of poetry; and her father taught her medicine, geography, and mathematics.

Wang Zhefu died in 1782 and the family traveled to Jiling (close to the Great Wall) for his funeral. They stayed in the region for five years, which is where Zhenyi gained extensive knowledge from reading her grandfather’s collection of books as well as learning equestrian skills, archery, and martial arts from the wife of a Mongolian general named Aa.

At the age of sixteen, Wang Zhenyi traveled south of the Yangtze river with her father until she moved back to the capital. She was able to see places like Shaanxi, Hubei, and Guangdong, broadening her horizons and enriching her experiences. When she was eighteen, she made friends with female scholars in Jiangning through her poetry and began focusing on her studies in astronomy and mathematics, most of which were self-taught. At age twenty-five she married Zhan Mei from Xuancheng in Anhui province. After her marriage, she became better known for her poetry and knowledge in mathematics and astronomy that she once taught to some male students. Wang Zhenyi died at age twenty-nine and had no children.

Academic achievements
Although she only lived to be twenty-nine, Wang Zhenyi was very accomplished in the academic world. She excelled in astronomy and mathematics. One of her contributions was being able to describe her views of celestial phenomena in her article, "Dispute of the Procession of the Equinoxes." She was able to explain and simply prove how equinoxes move and then how to calculate their movement. She wrote many other articles such as "Dispute of Longitude and Stars" as well as "The Explanation of a Lunar Eclipse." She commented on the number of stars; the revolving direction of the sun, the moon, and the planets Venus, Jupiter, Mars, Mercury, and Saturn; as well as describing the relationship between lunar and solar eclipses. Not only did she study the research of other astronomers, but she was also able to do her own original research.

One of her experiments to study a lunar eclipse included placing a round table in a garden pavilion, acting as a globe; she hung a crystal lamp on a cord from the ceiling beams, representing the sun. Then on one side of the table, she had a round mirror like the moon. She moved these three objects as if they were the sun, earth, and moon according to astronomical principles. Her findings and observations were very accurate and recorded in her article, "The Explanation of a Solar Eclipse."

In the realm of mathematics, Zhenyi mastered trigonometry and knew the Pythagorean theorem. She wrote an article called "The Explanation of the Pythagorean Theorem and Trigonometry," where she described a triangle and the relationship between the shorter leg of a right triangle, the long leg, and the triangle's hypotenuse all correctly.

She admired the mathematician Mei Wending (1633–1721 A.D.).  He was famous in the early Qing dynasty and wrote the book, Principles of Calculation. Wang Zhenyi became a master of this book, rewriting it with simpler language, and made it available to others under the title, The Musts of Calculation. She was able to simplify multiplication and division to make learning mathematics easier for beginners. She was very dedicated in her study of mathematics and wrote a book called The Simple Principles of Calculation when she was twenty-four. Her studies were difficult and she once said, "There were times that I had to put down my pen and sigh. But I love the subject, I do not give up."

Poetry
Her travel experiences as well as her academic research gave her plenty of ideas and material for her poetry. She left a lasting impression through her literature. She left thirteen volumes of Ci (poetry), prose, and prefaces and postscripts written for other works.  The famous Qing dynasty scholar Yuan Mei commented on Wang’s poetry by saying it, “had the flavor of a great pen, not of a female poet.” Zhenyi’s poetry was known for its lack of flowery words, at the time believed to be common to feminine traits.  Her poetry included her understanding of classics and history and experiences during her travels, such as sceneries and the lives of commoners with whom she made acquaintances.

Some examples of her work are:

“Transiting Tong Pass”

So important is the doorway,
occupying the throat of the mountain
Looking down from the heaven,
The sun sees Yellow river streaming

“Climbing Tai Mountain”

Clouds overcast the hills,
The sun bathes in the sea.

She also depicted the hard lives of commoners, especially those of laboring women in poems like “Woman Breeder of Silkworm” and “Clothes Washing.” In addition, she portrayed corruption and the polar contrast between the lives of the rich and poor in poems like “A Poem of Eight Lines,” which contained:

Village is empty of cooking smoke,
Rich families let grains stored decay;
In wormwood strewed pitiful starved bodies,
Greedy officials yet push farm levying.

Death
Wang Zhenyi died at the age of twenty-nine. There is no exact record of how she died. When she knew she was dying, she gave her works and manuscripts to her best friend, Madam Kuai (1763–1827 A.D.) who eventually passed them on to her nephew, Qian Yiji (1783–1850 A.D.), who was a famous scholar of the time. He compiled her work into Shusuan Jiancun or Simple Principles of Calculation. He described Wang Zhenyi as the "number one female scholar after Ban Zhao."

Legacy
Wang Zhenyi believed in equality and equal opportunity for both men and women. She wrote in one of her poems:

It's made to believe,
Women are the same as Men;
Are you not convinced,
Daughters can also be heroic?

She was pleased in her marriage, and she believed social feudal values were inappropriate "when talking about learning and sciences, people thought of no women," she said that "women should only do cooking and sewing, and that they should not be bothered about writing articles for publication, studying history, composing poetry or doing calligraphy." [Men and women] "are all people, who have the same reason for studying."

In 1994, the International Astronomical Union's (IAU) Working Group for Planetary System Nomenclature approved naming crater on Venus Wang Zhenyi after her.

See also 
Timeline of women in science

References

Other sources
"The Preliminary Collection of Defeng Pavilion" by Wang Zhenyi
The History of the Qing Dynasty, the 508th vol.: The Biography of Wang Zhenyi
The Biographies of 700 Noted Personages of the Qing Dynasty, Book Four, the biography of Wang Zhenyi by Cai Guanluo
The Supplementary Collection of Biographies on Stone Tablets: the 509th vol.: The Biography of Wang Zhenyi by Min Erchang
"The Third Edition of the Biographies, seventh vol., by Zhu Kebao
"The Preliminary Collection of the Classified Readings of the Dynasty," the 228th vol.
Textual Research into Works by Women Writers in History, seventh vol., by Hu Wenkai

1768 births
1797 deaths
Chinese women astronomers
Chinese women mathematicians
Place of birth missing
18th-century Chinese women
18th-century Chinese people
18th-century women scientists
18th-century Chinese astronomers
Scientists from Nanjing
Mathematicians from Jiangsu